Dumitru I. Remenco (1895 - July 13, 1940) was a Romanian journalist and philosopher from Chişinău, Bessarabia. He was a contributor at major newspapers of Bessarabia, such as Cuvânt moldovenesc, Viaţa Basarabiei, Glasul Basarabiei, Timpul.

Biography
Dumitru I. Remenco was born in 1895, in Hagi-Abdul, Ismail. He studied at Bolgrad and Odessa and, from 1919, at Alexandru Ioan Cuza University. During 1916-1917, while he was on the Romanian front, Remenco became a friend of Alexei Mateevici. In the fall of 1917, Dumitru I. Remenco married to Alexandra Remenco (1897–1959) from Peresecina and they had two children, Gheorghe Remenco (November 19, 1918, Chişinău - October 29, 1977, Chişinău) and Sergiu (b. Chişinău).

In 1921, Remenco he was a founder member of "Societatea de Belle - Arte din Basarabia". Dumitru I. Remenco worked as a journalist at La Răspântie (1921), Cuvânt moldovenesc, Raza, Viaţa Basarabiei, Glasul Basarabiei in Chişinău. He was a correspondent for the newspapers Timpul and Argus in Bucharest. Remenco was a friend of Nichifor Crainic, Vasile Ţepordei.

After the Soviet occupation of Bessarabia, he stayed in 1940, but was arrested and killed himself on July 13, 1940. He was buried at the Central cemetery on Armenească Street, Chişinău.

Works
 Remenco, Dumitru, Secretul prosperităţii presei locale, Viaţa Basarabiei, 1933, nr. 163.
 Remenco, Dumitru, Minoritarii şi Unirea, Viaţa Basarabiei, din 9 apr. 1933.
 Remenco, Dumitru, Bolşevicii şi Basarabia, Viaţa Basarabiei,  I, Nr. 1.
 Remenco D., Influenta psihologiei sociale rusesti asupra Basarabiei // Viaţa Basarabiei, 1933, no 4, pp. 99–103.

Bibliography 
 Iurie Colesnic, Destinul tragic al unui filozof din Basarabia interbelică: [despre Dumitru Remenco (1895–1940), filozof, ziarist la "Cuvânt moldovenesc", "Glasul Basarabiei", Viaţa Basarabiei, 2004, Nr. 2. pp. 210–220.
 Donos, Alexandru. În dar oamenilor: [Schiţă despre jurnalistul Gheorghe Remenco] // Nistru, 1979, Nr. 7, pp. 115–121.

References

External links 
 Dumitru I. Remenco - ziarist şi filosof
 Destinul tragic al unui filozof din Basarabia interbelică : [despre Dumitru Remenco (1895-1940), filozof, ziarist la "Cuvânt moldovenesc", "Glasul Basarabiei"
 CONTRIBUŢII PRIVIND ACTIVITATEA ORFELINATULUI „CASA COPILULUI” DIN CHIŞINĂU, Vera Stăvilă, Muzeul Naţional de Arheologie şi Istorie a Moldovei, str. 31 August, 121-A, MD-2012 Chişinău, Republica Moldova (2007) - Artikel (Moldavisch)
 Contribution to the study of the activity of the Chişinău orphanage “Children’s home”

1895 births
1940 deaths
People from Cahul District
20th-century Romanian philosophers
Romanian journalists
Moldovan journalists
Male journalists
20th-century journalists
1940 suicides
Suicides in Moldova